Sylhet District Stadium is located in Rekabi Bazar, Sylhet, Bangladesh with a capacity of 15,000. It is a multipurpose stadium mostly used for football and cricket. The stadium is currently the home venue for Abahani Limited Dhaka and Rahmatganj MFS.

History
In September 2011, the stadium hosted a friendly football match between the Under-23 teams of Bangladesh and Nepal, to prepare for the Asian Games. More than 50,000 viewers entered the stadium premises forcibly, by breaking the main entrance of the stadium.

The stadium has hosted the 2015 SAFF U-16 Championship where Bangladesh clinched the title and some matches of the 2015 Bangabandhu Cup.

Almost a half-month long renovation which started on 20 September  was done for the stadium for the 2018 Bangabandhu Cup. New colours were shed on gallery, the dressing rooms were upgraded, and digital boards were installed in the stadium. 190 new bulbs were added to four floodlight stands; all of which had 400 bulbs prior to the upgrade.

See also
List of football stadiums in Bangladesh
List of stadiums in Bangladesh

References

External links 
Picture of the stadium

Football venues in Bangladesh
Cricket grounds in Bangladesh
Sport in Sylhet
1965 establishments in East Pakistan
Sports venues completed in 1965